The men's 110 metres hurdles event at the 2011 Summer Universiade was held on 19–20 August.

Medalists

Results

Heats
Qualification: First 4 of each heat (Q) and the next 4 fastest (q) qualified for the semifinals.

Wind:Heat 1: +0.2 m/s, Heat 2: 0.0 m/s, Heat 3: -1.4 m/s, Heat 4: +0.6 m/s, Heat 5: -1.8 m/s

Semifinals
Qualification: First 2 of each semifinal (Q) and the next 2 fastest (q) qualified for the final.

Wind:Heat 1: -0.7 m/s, Heat 2: +0.2 m/s, Heat 3: -1.0 m/s

Final
Wind: -0.3 m/s

References
Heats results
Semifinals results
Final results

Hurdles
2011